Locust Grove, also known as the Foster House, is a historic plantation house located at Ingleside, Franklin County, North Carolina.   It was built about 1790, and is a two-story, five bay, Georgian style frame dwelling with a high gable roof.  It has a rear ell to form a "T"-shaped plan.  From 1797 to 1809, it was owned by noted American politician John Haywood (1754-1827), who was the longest-serving North Carolina State Treasurer.

It was listed on the National Register of Historic Places in 1975.

References

Plantation houses in North Carolina
Houses on the National Register of Historic Places in North Carolina
Houses completed in 1790
Haywood family residences
Georgian architecture in North Carolina
Houses in Franklin County, North Carolina
National Register of Historic Places in Franklin County, North Carolina